The Fourth Lyons ministry (United Australia–Country Coalition) was the 23rd ministry of the Government of Australia. It was led by the country's 10th Prime Minister, Joseph Lyons. The Fourth Lyons ministry succeeded the Third Lyons ministry, which dissolved on 29 November 1937 following the federal election that took place in October. The ministry was replaced by the Page ministry on 7 April 1939 following the death of Lyons - the first of three occasions where a sitting Prime Minister died in office.

John McEwen, who died in 1980, was the last surviving member of the Fourth Lyons ministry; McEwen was also the last surviving member of the Page ministry. Robert Menzies was the last surviving UAP minister.

Ministry

Notes

Ministries of George VI
Lyons, 4
1937 establishments in Australia
1939 disestablishments in Australia
Cabinets established in 1937
Cabinets disestablished in 1939